Vemuri Visweswar (Viswa) is a Telugu movie lyricist, music director, singer and dubbing artist. He has worked for more than 250 films and is multi -talented . Viswa has attracted telugu audience by skillfully blending catchy Sanskrit, English and Hindi words in his writings . His trendy word play,musical and vocal talents made him popular among critics and audience. Star heroes and directors wish to collaborate with Vishwa for his unique ability to elevate heroism through his intense lyrics. Viswa is a versatile writer in present generation of Telugu Film Industry (TFI) who covered almost all genres in his lyrics. His lyrics for introduction and title songs for all acclaimed actors deserves special mention.

His famous works include title songs of Mahesh babu starrers 'Athadu',and Dookudu, and N.T.R Starrers Badshah and Temper, also Venkatesh Starrers'"Dhaga Dhaga merise" from the movie Lakshmi (2006 film) and Shadow, and Allu Arjun's Race Gurram, Iddarammaayilathoe  "You rock my world" from Arya, Narthanatara from Ek Niranjan, Dole Dole from Pokiri, "Disturb Cheyyaku" from Athidhi, "Gicchi Gicchi" and "Chandra Mukhi" from Super, "Ye oore" from Badra, "Va Va Varevaa" from Bunny, "Chal Chal Re" from Happy, "Gundelni Pindedhi" from Devadasu, "Yadalo Evo" and "Rock and Roll" from Style.

Athadu Title Song which was written and sung by Viswa is considered one of the evergreen hit songs in Superstar Mahesh Babu's career. Viswa's latest songs 'Don Bosco' From Amar Akbar Antony is a chartbuster and 'Asha Paasham' from C/o Kancharapalem is critically Acclaimed Song.The hit song "Ningi chutte" in Umamaheswara Ugraroopasya was well received by music lovers and has established his versatility.
.He turned into a composer and Music Director through the film Hyderabad Nawabs. Soon he proved his proficiency through films like Police Police, Mangala and Nenu Naa Rakshasi. The song "Padithinammo", which was composed, written and sung by Viswa,became a popular song among all sections of audience.

The title song of Dookudu, "Nee dookudu" won the Big FM best lyrics award for 2011. In the same year "Chiguru Boniya" from the movie Teen maar, which was sung and written by Viswa, also became a hit. His latest hits are violin song from 'Iddarammayilathoe' Down Down from 'Racegurram', and Choolenge Aasma from 'Temper' movies. Viswa sang a poignant song Kshaminchu Lakshmi in Lakshmi's NTR which became an instant hit.his current projects as lyricist are hero Nagachaitanya Starrer Movie "Thank you" in which he has written "sye ante sye ra"song.and also "Avasaraala Srinivas's Movie "Nootokka Jillaala Andagaadu",

As a dubbing artist Viswa has lent his voice for Kabir Bedi in Gautamiputra Saatakarni, Jackie Shroff in Shakti, Kaatraj in Chatrapathi, Prabhu in Bejawada' and 'ponniyan selvan-1', Abhimanyu Singh in Rakhta Charithra, Rahul Dev in Simhadri, Pasupathi in Nenunnanu, the opening voiceover in Damarukam and many more. His baritone voice has elevated the characters of villains in many films. His latest films include lending voice to Kabir Bedi in Gautamiputra Satakarni, Rajaa Murad in Padmavat, and legendary Hollywood actor Lloyd Owen in Thugs of Hindostan''.He lent voice for Telugu legendary superstar N.T.R character in ram gopal varma's Lakshmi's NTR for which he was widely appreciated.he also lent his voice to Bollywood actor Sonu Sood who played Arjuna  in magumopus "KuruKshetra".viswa has lent his voice to legendary sound recordist and drummer Ranjith Baroth who played a savvy role with negative shades in A.R.Rehman Produced film "99 Songs".viswa has dubbed for Vijay Sethupathi in National Award Winning film "Super Deluxe".

 As lyricist

 As dubbing artist

References

Indian male songwriters
Living people
Singers from Hyderabad, India
Year of birth missing (living people)